Viliami Pulu (born 14 May 1960) is a Tongan boxer. He competed in the men's super heavyweight event at the 1984 Summer Olympics.

References

External links
 

1960 births
Living people
Super-heavyweight boxers
Tongan male boxers
Olympic boxers of Tonga
Boxers at the 1984 Summer Olympics
Place of birth missing (living people)